Nina Tower is a twin tower of 80-storey and 42-storey high-rise buildings in Tsuen Wan, New Territories, Hong Kong near Tsuen Wan West station. However, due to its location near Chek Lap Kok Airport, the height was restricted to the current .

The owner of Chinachem Group later changed her plan and broke it into two towers. The lower is known as Nina Tower, symbolising the late Nina Wang or Kung Yu Sum natively, the owner of Chinachem Group; the higher is Teddy Tower, symbolising her husband Teddy Wang, who was kidnapped and has since disappeared. Despite the different tower names, the whole development is called Nina Tower.

The complex is home to a 1608-room premium hotel, Nina Hotel Tsuen Wan West, office space, shopping mall and convention & event space. Sky Lobby is located at the 41st floor which connects the 2 towers.

The head office of Chinachem Group and Nina Hospitality Company Limited are located at the complex.

In March 2021, L’hotel Group has been renamed Nina Hospitality to unveil its brand transformation.

The complex contains the head office of Chinachem.

See also 
List of tallest buildings in Hong Kong

References

External links 

 Official website
 Nina Tower on CTBUH Skyscraper Center
 Emporis

Tsuen Wan
Skyscraper office buildings in Hong Kong
Buildings and structures completed in 2006
Chinachem
Twin towers
Skyscraper hotels in Hong Kong
Shopping centres in Hong Kong
2006 establishments in Hong Kong